State Route 288 (SR 288) is a  long east–west state highway in the northern portion of the U.S. state of Ohio.

Route description

SR 288 runs exclusively through the rural northern portion of Morrow County.  The route begins at a T-intersection with SR 309 in Washington Township.  It heads a short distance east and immediately intersects SR 61.  SR 288 curves to the east-northeast just past this junction, bounded by farmland on the south side and woods on the north side.  A few homes soon begin to appear alongside the roadway, as the land on the north side opens up prior to SR 288's crossing of the CSX railway.  The highway soon crosses into North Bloomfield Township, where the rural setting features occasional patches of woods and a few homes amidst the predominant farmlands.  SR 288 passes through successive intersections with Atkinson Road (County Road 38, CR 38) and West Point–Galion Road (CR 40) prior to its junction with SR 19.  Continuing to the east-northeast, SR 288 crosses Clase Road (Township Road 236, TR 236), Williamsport–Crestline Road (CR 46), North Bloomfield Road (TR 48), Williamsport–Williamsburg Road (CR 20) and Meadowcreek Place (TR 249).  SR 288 comes to an end as it arrives as the T-intersection it has with SR 97.
  
No part of this highway is included within the National Highway System.

History
The SR 288 designation was applied in 1953.  This route has utilized the same alignment through northern Morrow County since it was first established.

An earlier SR 288 designation became SR 640 in 1941.

Major intersections

References

External links

288
Transportation in Morrow County, Ohio